A genset locomotive is a locomotive in which a number of smaller diesel engines are used rather than a single large engine. The term is short for "generator set."

Aspects of gensets 
A genset uses one to three small diesel engines to provide power. An operator is able to activate each engine as needed, with more than one engine gensets activating one for light work and activating more for heavier work, with excess engines turned off when the extra power is not needed.

Advantages 
 More efficient design.
 Longer service life.
 Fuel savings. 
 Ultra-low emissions.
 Improved wheel to rail adhesion capability.
 With multiple engine gensets, should one genset engine fail, the others can keep the train going, albeit at reduced speed.
 Removing a genset engine requires smaller size crane, while a larger crane is required to remove a traditional diesel prime mover.

Disadvantages 
 More complex design.
 Greater capital cost.
 Greater deadweight.
 More engines, and the engines and generators do not use standard parts, reducing reliability.
 Multiple smaller truck type engines which lack the hardiness of a single large railroad type prime mover.
 Engineers do not like them because they are slow to get a cut of cars moving.

Table of produced gensets

See also 

 NRE 3GS21B
 Glossary of North American railway terms: Genset
 Railpower GGS2000D - a one-off.

References

External links 
 What is a Genset locomotive?

Diesel locomotives